Samuel Bouriah (born 19 October 1969), better known by his stage name DJ Sammy, is a Spanish DJ and record producer. He has released five albums and has had five top-10 hits, including a cover of Bryan Adams' "Heaven", which reached number one in the UK in 2002. His career started with ex-wife Marie-José van der Kolk in the making of his first singles, under the stage name of DJ Sammy featuring Carisma.

Career
DJ Sammy started his music career in 1984 in pubs and dance clubs of Mallorca. During this time he completed training as a sound technician at the Mallorca Music College. In 1991, he met dancer Marie-José van der Kolk and they performed at Zorba's Club in Palma. In 1992, DJ Sammy became resident DJ at the Joy Palace Club in Arenal and Marie Jose was a resident dancer there.

In November 1995, DJ Sammy released his first single "Life Is Just a Game" with Marie-José who started singing. The track became a Top 10 hit in the Spanish record chart. Other singles, such as "You're My Angel" and "Prince of Love", have been popular in the German record chart. In June 1998, DJ Sammy released his debut album, Life Is Just a Game.

DJ Sammy founded his own music label, Super M Records, as well as the Gamba Music Company. In 2002, Sammy released the album, Heaven with charting singles released such as "Sunlight" and cover versions of Bryan Adams, "Heaven" with Dutch vocalist Do and Don Henley's "The Boys of Summer".

In 2005, his next album was The Rise, with charting singles such as "Rise Again" which was featured on the 2004 movie soundtrack, It's All Gone Pete Tong, and a cover of Annie Lennox's "Why".

In 2007, Sammy collaborated with Enrique Iglesias, remixing his song "Tired of Being Sorry", the second track from his hit album, Insomniac. Following this success, in April 2007, Marta Sánchez released the song "Superstar", produced and co-written by Sammy. The song was her biggest hit since "Soy Yo". On David Bisbal's album Premonición, Sammy wrote and produced the track "Aquí Ahora". He also worked on Soraya Arnelas' album, Sin Miedo.

He toured the world with the Balearic Masters tour, which commenced at the end of 2007. He took his protégé, writer and singer, Nyah, who featured on the tracks "Everybody Hurts", "Feel the Love", "Animal", and "Look for Love" co-produced by Nick Marsh.

In June 2013, Sammy released the single such as "Shut Up and Kiss Me" with a vocalist The Jackie Boyz, the music video is directed by Mark Feuerstake. On 18 June 2013, he uploaded the music video onto YouTube.

In July 2020, Sammy released the single "This Is Who We Are" with Australian vocalist Chloe Martin, and he uploaded the lyric video onto YouTube.

Discography

Studio albums

DJ mixes

Singles

Music videos

References

External links 
 Official Site
 MyClubRoom Radio Show & Podcast (weekly), hosted by DJ Sammy
 [ Official US Billboard Charts]
 DJ Sammy Biography on Central Station Records
 DJ Sammy Biography on Sing365

1969 births
Living people
Spanish DJs
Spanish dance musicians
Musicians from the Balearic Islands
People from Mallorca
Electronic dance music DJs